Hercules Troyden Prinsloo (born November 16, 1985) is a freestyle swimmer from South Africa, who won three gold medals at the 2007 All-Africa Games. Previously he earned a silver medal in the men's 800m freestyle at the Pan Pacific Games, and placed third at the 2006 Commonwealth Games in the men's 1500m freestyle. He also represented South Africa at the 2008 Summer Olympics in Beijing and at the 2012 Summer Olympics in London.

Major Results

Individual

Long course

1 Did not start in the final B. (At the heats, he finished 12th place with 3:54.10)

Short course

Open water swimming

Relay

Short course

See also
List of Commonwealth Games medallists in swimming (men)

References

 SuperSwimmer

1985 births
Living people
Afrikaner people
South African male freestyle swimmers
Georgia Bulldogs men's swimmers
Olympic swimmers of South Africa
Swimmers at the 2008 Summer Olympics
Swimmers at the 2012 Summer Olympics
South African people of Dutch descent
Commonwealth Games medallists in swimming
Commonwealth Games bronze medallists for South Africa
African Games gold medalists for South Africa
African Games medalists in swimming
Swimmers at the 2006 Commonwealth Games
Competitors at the 2007 All-Africa Games
20th-century South African people
21st-century South African people
Medallists at the 2006 Commonwealth Games